Hemoglobin subunit delta is a protein that in humans is encoded by the HBD gene.

Function 

The delta (HBD) and beta (HBB) genes are normally expressed in the adult: two alpha chains plus two beta chains constitute HbA, which in normal adult life comprises about 97% of the total hemoglobin. Two alpha chains plus two delta chains constitute HbA2, which with HbF comprises the remaining 3% of adult hemoglobin. Five beta-like globin genes are found within a 45 kb cluster on chromosome 11 in the following order: 5' - epsilon – gamma-G – gamma-A – delta – beta - 3'.

Clinical significance 

Mutations in the delta-globin gene are associated with Delta-thalassemia.

See also
 Hemoglobin
 Human β-globin locus
 Thalassemia

References

Further reading

Hemoglobins